Beatrice Marie De Alba (August 10, 1964) is an Academy Award winning Mexican-American hair stylist and make-up artist.

Biography
Beatrice De Alba was born in Los Angeles and is of Mexican-American ethnicity. She began her career as a make-up artist in Los Angeles, California working in both film and television. She soon gravitated toward wigs and period hair design.  As the Hair Department Head on the film Frida (2002), she  won an Academy Award and a BAFTA Award.  She has also been nominated for a Primetime Emmy Award for the made-for-television film Liz & Dick (2012).

She was the series' department head hairstylist for the 2012-2013 Starz show Magic City.

In 2016, she was invited to join the Academy of Motion Picture Arts and Sciences.

She created Matthew McConaughey's long-haired blond wig for the 2019 movie The Beach Bum.

Selected filmography
Californication (2014)
The Twilight Saga: Breaking Dawn – Part 2  (2012)
The Twilight Saga: Breaking Dawn – Part 1 (2011)
The Curious Case of Benjamin Button (2008)
National Treasure (2004)
Frida (2002)
The Mummy Returns (2001)
Blast from the Past (1999)
Jingle All the Way (1996)
Wild Hearts Can't Be Broken (1991)

References

External links



1964 births
Living people
Best Makeup Academy Award winners
Best Makeup BAFTA Award winners
Mexican make-up artists